The 1964–65 Yorkshire Football League was the 39th season in the history of the Yorkshire Football League, a football competition in England.

Division One

Division One featured 12 clubs which competed in the previous season, along with four new clubs, promoted from Division Two:
Brodsworth Miners Welfare
Harrogate Railway Athletic
Hatfield Main
Rawmarsh Welfare

League table

Map

Division Two

Division Two featured nine clubs which competed in the previous season, along with six new clubs.
Clubs relegated from Division One:
Doncaster United
Norton Woodseats
Stocksbridge Works
Swallownest Miners Welfare
Plus:
Barton Town, joined from the Lincolnshire Football League
Retford Town reserves

League table

Map

League Cup

Final

References

1964–65 in English football leagues
Yorkshire Football League